Jean-Marie Thierry Alphonse Ghislain van der Dussen de Kestergat (8 April 1922  27 July 1992), better known under his pen name Jean Kestergat or JK was a Belgian journalist.

Early life 

Jean Kestergat was the son of Marcel van der Dussen de Kestergat and Charlotte . He studied at the Agronomic institute of Gembloux, before becoming a volunteer at the Royal Navy from 1944 to 1946.

Journalistic career 

Kestergat started his career in journalism as an intern at Le Phare in 1946. On 12 September 1946, he married Jacqueline . In 1950, he started to work at La Libre Belgique, where he would stay until his retirement in 1987. Initially, Kestergat reported on domestic Belgian matters, until he undertook his first foreign mission in 1957. The next year, he reported on the Belgian Congo for the first time, which would become his main subject for the rest of his career. In that context, he reported on the Shaba I and Shaba II wars in 1977 and 1978, as well as bilateral Belgo-Congolese (or Belgo-Zairean) relations under President Mobutu Sese Seko.

Together with Jacques Brassinne de La Buissière, who wrote his doctoral dissertation on the murder of the first Congolese Prime Minister Patrice Lumumba, he wrote Qui a tué Patrice Lumumba? ("Who killed Patrice Lumumba?").

Publications

References

External links 
Homepage of the van der Dussen family

1922 births
1992 deaths
Belgian journalists
Belgian political journalists
20th-century Belgian journalists
Belgian prisoners of war in World War II
World War II prisoners of war held by Germany
Royal Navy personnel of World War II